Welkinweir is a  nonprofit arboretum, garden, mansion, and conservation area located at 1368 Prizer Road, East Nantmeal Township, Pennsylvania, United States, near Pottstown. It is part of the Hopewell Big Woods. It is open to the public daily without charge.

Welkinweir was the home of Everett and Grace Rodebaugh, founding members of the conservation-minded Green Valleys Association, who bought the site in the 1930s and spent decades improving it. Their house was built in 1940, building upon a much smaller house, built in two sections c. 1750 and c. 1830. The architect Fridtjof Tobiessen designed the 1940 mansion. The property was placed into a conservation easement in 1976, donated to the association in 1997, and is now its headquarters and educational center. In 2001, the estate was listed on the National Register of Historic Places.

Its arboretum includes cherry, dogwood, dwarf evergreens, franklinia, magnolia, Japanese maple, swamp and sugar maple, and sweetgum, as well as azaleas and rhododendrons.

See also
 List of botanical gardens in the United States

References

External links

 Welkinweir - official site
 Green Valleys Association

Arboreta in Pennsylvania
Botanical gardens in Pennsylvania
Parks in Chester County, Pennsylvania
Houses on the National Register of Historic Places in Pennsylvania
Colonial Revival architecture in Pennsylvania
Houses completed in 1940
Nature centers in Pennsylvania
Houses in Chester County, Pennsylvania
National Register of Historic Places in Chester County, Pennsylvania
Protected areas of Chester County, Pennsylvania
1940 establishments in Pennsylvania